The Japanese squirrel (Sciurus lis) is a tree squirrel in the genus Sciurus endemic to Japan. It was described by Dutch zoologist Coenraad Jacob Temminck in 1844. The Japanese squirrel's range includes the islands of Honshū, Shikoku, and Kyūshū. Recently, populations on south-western Honshū and Shikoku decreased, and those on Kyūshū disappeared. One of the factors affecting the local extinction of this species seems to be forest fragmentation by humans.

In certain areas, up to 35% of its diet can come from walnuts. It is possible the resulting dispersion has affected the evolution of larger seed sizes among Japanese walnut populations where Japanese squirrels are present.Furthermore, Japanese walnut (Juglans ailanthifolia) is an important food for Japanese squirrels in lowland mixed-species forests in Japan. Japanese squirrels feeding technique consists of opening the hard shell of walnuts by chewing along the crease of the shell, embedding its teeth into the cleft, and airing out the two parts. This strategy seems to be efficient since it minimizes the time to finish eating an entire walnut.

References

External links

Endemic mammals of Japan
Sciurus
Mammals described in 1844
Taxonomy articles created by Polbot